Boriti is a village in the Kharagauli Municipality of Imereti in western Georgia. It lies on the river Dzirula.

References
 Georgian Soviet Encyclopedia Vol. 2, p. 471, 1977.

Geography of Georgia (country)
Populated places in Kharagauli Municipality